CND is the Campaign for Nuclear Disarmament in the United Kingdom.

CND may also refer to:

Aviation
 Aero Continente Dominicana, former Dominican Republic airline, ICAO airline code
 Mihail Kogălniceanu International Airport, Northern Dobruja, Romania, IATA airport code

Organizations
 Centre National de la Danse (National Dance Centre), France
 Congregation of Notre Dame of Montreal, a Catholic women's community
 Spanish National Dance Company (Compañía Nacional de Danza)
 United Nations Commission on Narcotic Drugs

Science and technology
 US military computer network defense in computer network operations

See also

 C&D (disambiguation)
 CD (disambiguation)